VPS Lakeshore, also known as Lakeshore Hospital is a multi super-speciality Hospital in Kochi, Kerala, India. It is located along National Highway 66 in Nettoor, and is a 650-bedded facility with over 30 clinical departments. The hospital is headed by Shamsheer Vayalil, the founder and managing director of VPS Healthcare.

Profile
VPS Lakeshore Hospital and Research Centre Ltd was found by Dr.Philip Augustine registered as a public limited company in 1996 and started functioning as a multi-specialty hospital in January 2003. The hospital is accredited by the National Accreditation Board for Hospitals & Healthcare Providers (NABH) and has 43 intensive care units and 10 operation theatres. It is one of the largest tertiary care hospital in the state and is managed by VPS Healthcare, which took over the management from Philip Augustine in April 2016. It has air, water and surface ambulance services which was listed by the Limca Book of Records in 2004. Besides medical care, it also conducts several post graduate programs accredited by the Diplomate of National Board.

The second phase expansion of its facilities by adding 200,000 sq. ft. to house oncology, cardiology and gastroenterology departments are under development. The first pediatric bone marrow transplant, the first liver transplant and the first liver dialysis in Kerala and the first insulin pump insertion in South India are some of the reported achievements of the hospital. The new structure is supposedly open to public by mid 2018.

Awards and achievements 

 VPS Lakeshore's 'HEART', which is a replica of the same organ was awarded the Guinness World Record for the Largest Model of a Human Organ. The structure which is 31.81 ft tall and 22.88 ft wide was installed at the top of its new hospital block.

References

External links
 

Hospitals in Kochi
2003 establishments in Kerala
Hospitals established in 2003